Pennine Radio may refer to:
 Pennine Radio Limited, an electronics company in Huddersfield.
 Pennine Radio (radio station), a former radio station based in Bradford (now known as the Pulse).
 Pennine FM, a former radio station based in Huddersfield (previously known as Home FM and Huddersfield FM).